Robert Charles O'Connor (January 27, 1904 – May 2, 1998) was a guard, tackle and blocking back in the National Football League who played for the Green Bay Packers.  O'Connor played collegiate ball for Stanford University and played professionally for one season, in 1935.

References

1904 births
1998 deaths
Sportspeople from Elmira, New York
Players of American football from New York (state)
American football offensive linemen
Stanford Cardinal football players
Green Bay Packers players